Jerome Robert Busemeyer is a Distinguished Professor at Indiana University Bloomington in the Department of Psychological & Brain Sciences  and Cognitive Science Program. 

Busemeyer completed his undergraduate degree in Psychology at the University of Cincinnati in 1973, which he followed with both a masters and Ph.D. in Experimental Psychology from the University of South Carolina in 1976 and 1979 respectively. He was a NIMH post doctoral fellow in the Quantitative program at University of Illinois until 1980. Afterwards, he became a faculty member at Purdue University until 1997, and then he joined the faculty at Indiana University-Bloomington. He was president of the Society for Mathematical Psychology in 1993, and he also served as the Manager of the Cognition and Decision Program at the Air Force Office of Scientific Research in 2005-2007. He was Chief Editor of Journal of Mathematical Psychology from 2005 to 2010, and he is the inaugural Editor of the APA journal Decision.

Research 

His research investigates the cognitive processes and dynamics of human judgment and decision making using mathematical modeling. He is one of the developers of a theory of decision making called decision field theory. He is also one of the developers of the field of quantum cognition. He has authored several books and hundreds of articles over the course of his career.

Personal History 

Jerome Busemeyer was born in Cincinnati, Ohio, in the year 1950. He attended Moeller High School.  He married a Traditional Doctor of Chinese Medicine named Meijuan Lu. He has two sons, James and Brian, and a step son Sheng Yi. His father was Robert H. Busemeyer, who was a well known electrical contractor in Cincinnati.

Awards 
 Honorary Doctorate of the university of Basel in Psychology, 2019 
 Distinguished Professor Indiana University, 2017
 Fellow of American Academy of Arts and Sciences, 2017
 Fellow Cognitive Science Society, 2017
 Society of Experimental Psychologists Howard C. Warren medal, 2015
 Fellow of the Society of Experimental Psychologists, 2006

References

1950 births
Living people
University of South Carolina alumni
Indiana University Bloomington faculty
American cognitive scientists